Senator Mathis may also refer to:

Liz Mathis (born 1958), Iowa State Senator
Thomas A. Mathis (1869–1958), New Jersey State Senator and political boss
W. Steelman Mathis (1898–1981), New Jersey State Senator

See also
Senator Mathias (disambiguation)